The constitutive androstane receptor (CAR) also known as nuclear receptor subfamily 1, group I, member 3 is a protein that  in humans is encoded by the NR1I3 gene. In response, expression of proteins responsible for the metabolism and excretion of these substances is upregulated. Hence, CAR and PXR play a major role in the detoxification of foreign substances such as drugs.

Androstenol and several isomers of androstanol, androstanes, are endogenous antagonists of the CAR, and despite acting as antagonists, were the basis for the naming of this receptor. More recently, dehydroepiandrosterone (DHEA), also an androstane, has been found to be an endogenous agonist of the CAR.

Function 

CAR is a member of the nuclear receptor superfamily, and is a key regulator of xenobiotic and  metabolism. Unlike most nuclear receptors, this transcriptional regulator is constitutively active in the absence of ligand and is regulated by both agonists and inverse agonists. Ligand binding results in translocation of CAR from the cytosol into the nucleus, where the protein can bind to specific DNA sites, called response elements. Binding occurs both as a monomer and together with the retinoid X receptor (RXR) resulting in activation or repression of target gene transcription. CAR-regulated genes are involved in drug metabolism and bilirubin  clearance. Examples for CAR-regulated genes are members of the CYP2B, CYP2C, and CYP3A subfamilies, sulfotransferases, and glutathione-S-transferases. Ligands binding to CAR include bilirubin, a variety of foreign compounds, steroid hormones, and prescription drugs.

Activation mechanism 

Phosphorylated CAR forms a multiprotein complex with the heat shock protein 90 (hsp90) and the cytoplasmic CAR retention protein (CCRP) which keep CAR in the cytosol thereby inactivating it. CAR can be activated in two ways: by direct binding of a ligand (e.g. TCPOBOP) or indirect regulation by phenobarbital (PB), a common seizure medication, facilitating the dephosphorylation of CAR through protein phosphatase 2 (PP2A) (Fig. 1).

Both lead to the release of CAR from the multiprotein complex and its translocation into the nucleus. Here, CAR forms a heterodimer with retinoid X receptor (RXR) and interacts with the phenobarbital-responsive enhancer module (PBREM), a distal enhancer activating transcription of CAR target genes.
 
The consensus sequence of PBREM, containing direct repeat-4 motifs, was found to be conserved in mouse, rat and human 'Cyp2b' genes.

Direct activation 

1,4-bis[2-(3,5-dichloropyridyloxy)]benzene (TCPOBOP) is thought to bind directly to mouse CAR, thus inducing its translocation into the nucleus.  TCPOBOP does not bind to human CAR and hence has no effect on it. Human CAR can be activated by CITCO (6-(4-chlorophenyl)imidazo(2,1-b)(1,3)thiazole-5-carbaldehyde O-(3,4-dichlorobenzyl)oxime).

Indirect activation 

Phenobarbital (PB), a widely used anticonvulsant, is used as a model ligand for indirect CAR activation.  PB activates CAR, by inducing the dephosphorylation of CAR through PP2A. How PP2A is activated remains unclear, but several different mechanisms have been proposed.  The recruitment of PP2A has been shown to be mediated by the multiprotein complex. As PB is involved in the activation of AMP-activated protein kinase, it has been suggested that AMPK activates PP2A.
 
Alternatively, PP2A might be activated through another pathway including the epidermal growth factor receptor (EGFR) and the receptor for activated C kinase 1 (RACK1). In the absence of PB, the epidermal growth factor (EGF) binds to EGFR, thereby activating the steroid receptor coactivator-1 (Src1), which in turn phosphorylates RACK1. Upon PB-exposure, PB binds competitively to EGFR and thus leads to inactivation of Src1. This results in a dephosphorylation of RACK1, which can subsequently stimulate PP2A to activate CAR.

References

Further reading

External links 
 
 

1